Walter Frederick Boone (February 14, 1898 – March 19, 1995) was an admiral in the United States Navy. Born in Berkeley, California, Boone joined the Navy in 1917. Participating in World War II, Boone was awarded the Silver Star in 1942 for actions during the Battle of the Santa Cruz Islands. He was later Commander in Chief, U.S. Naval Forces, Eastern Atlantic and Mediterranean from 1956–1958 and U.S. Military Representative, NATO Military Committee from 1958–1960. Boone was also superintendent of the U.S. Naval Academy from August 12, 1954 to March 16, 1956. He retired in 1960. Boone died in 1995 of a heart attack at the age of 97.

References

1898 births
1995 deaths
United States Navy personnel of World War II
United States Navy admirals
United States Naval Academy alumni
Recipients of the Navy Distinguished Service Medal
Recipients of the Silver Star
Recipients of the Legion of Merit
Superintendents of the United States Naval Academy
20th-century American academics